Roodt railway station is a railway station serving Roodt-sur-Syre, in the commune of Betzdorf, in eastern Luxembourg.  It is operated by Société Nationale des Chemins de Fer Luxembourgeois, the state-owned railway company.

The station is situated on Line 30, which connects Luxembourg City to the east of the country and Trier.

External links
 Official CFL page on Roodt station
 Rail.lu page on Roodt station

Betzdorf, Luxembourg
Railway stations in Luxembourg
Railway stations on CFL Line 30